The Board of Intermediate and Secondary Education Swat is an educational governmental body in Malakand Division, which conducts the exams, assign duties, and register the educational institutes in the region.

History
The board came into existence in 1992, two years later of the split of combined Board of Intermediate and Secondary Education, Peshawar for the entire province. It is located in Kokrai, on the marghazar Salampur road Swat.

Jurisdiction
The following Districts are included in the autonomy of BISE Swat;

 Swat District 
 Shangla 
 Buner

See also
 List of educational boards in Pakistan
 Board of Intermediate and Secondary Education, Peshawar

References

Swat District
S